
Year 154 BC was a year of the pre-Julian Roman calendar. At the time it was known as the Year of the Consulship of Opimius and Albinus/Glabrio (or, less frequently, year 600 Ab urbe condita). The denomination 154 BC for this year has been used since the early medieval period, when the Anno Domini calendar era became the prevalent method in Europe for naming years.

Events 
 By place 

 Hispania 
 The Lusitanians harry the inhabitants of the Roman provinces in Hispania. At the same time, the Celtiberians of Numantia on the Douro revolt against their Roman occupation.

 Asia Minor 
 After a two-year struggle, Attalus II Philadelphus of Pergamum is finally able to defeat Prusias II, the aggressive king of Bithynia in northern Anatolia. He is assisted in his battle against Prusias II by Ariarathes V of Cappadocia (who has sent his son Demetrius to command his forces) and by the Romans.
 After his victory, Attalus II insists on heavy reparations from Prusias II. In response, Prusias II sends his son Nicomedes to Rome to ask the Romans' help in reducing the amount of these reparations.

 Egypt 
 The Egyptian king Ptolemy VI Philometor defeats his brother, Ptolemy VIII Euergetes, after he attempts to seize Cyprus by force. Nevertheless Philometor restores his brother to Cyrenaica, marries one of his daughters to him, and grants him a grain subsidy.

 China 
 The Rebellion of the Seven States against the Han Dynasty fails and Emperor Jing of Han further consolidates his power at the expense of the regional, semi-autonomous kings governing the eastern portion of the empire.

Births 
 Gaius Gracchus, Roman politician, younger brother of Tiberius Sempronius Gracchus, who, like him, will pursue a popular political agenda that ultimately ends in his death (d. 121 BC)
 Lucius Aelius Stilo Praeconinus, Roman philologist and speechwriter (d. 74 BC)

Deaths 
 Chao Cuo, Chinese advisor and official of the Han Dynasty (b. c. 200 BC)
 Liu Pi, Chinese prince and general of the Han Dynasty (b. 216 BC)

References